Cohn House and variations may refer to:

 Habicht-Cohn-Crow House, Arkadelphia, Arkansas, listed on the National Register of Historic Places (NRHP) in Clark County
 Cohn House (Folsom, California), listed on the NRHP Sacramento County
 Emile Cohn House, Brookhaven, Mississippi, listed on the NRHP in Lincoln County
 Cohn–Sichel House, Portland, Oregon, listed on the NRHP in Multnomah County
 Arthur B. Cohn House, Houston, Texas, listed on the NRHP in Harris County
 Joe Cohn House, Waxahachie, Texas, listed on the NRHP in Ellis County
 Henry A. and Tile S. Cohn House, Salt Lake City, Utah, listed on the NRHP in Salt Lake County